The discography of French electronic music project M83. It consists of nine studio albums and thirty-four singles. Their debut studio album, M83, was released in April 2001. Their second studio album, Dead Cities, Red Seas & Lost Ghosts, was released in April 2003. The album peaked at number 116 on the French Albums Chart. Their third studio album, Before the Dawn Heals Us, was released in January 2005. The album peaked at number 103 on the French Albums Chart. Their fourth studio album, Digital Shades Vol. 1, was released in September 2007. Their fifth studio album, Saturdays = Youth, was released in April 2008. The album peaked at number 173 on the French Albums Chart. Their sixth studio album, Hurry Up, We're Dreaming, was released in October 2011. The album peaked at number 38 on the French Albums Chart. Their seventh studio album, Junk, was released in April 2016. The album peaked at number 26 on the French Albums Chart. Their eighth studio album, DSVII, was released in September 2019. The album peaked at number 98 on the French Albums Chart. The group released their ninth studio album, Fantasy, on 17 March 2023.

Albums

Studio albums

Soundtrack albums

Singles

Other charted songs

References

Notes

Sources

Discographies of French artists